The 14th NKP Salve Challenger Trophy was an Indian domestic cricket tournament that was held in Cuttack from 23 October to 26 October 2008. The series involved the domestic teams from India which were India Blue, India Red, and India Green. India Blue defeated India Red by 8 wickets in the final to become the champions of the tournament.

Squads

 Chetanya Nanda replaced Amit Mishra in the India Blue squad, after he was retained in the Indian squad by selectors for the final two tests against Australia.

Points Table

Matches

Group stage

Final

References

Indian domestic cricket competitions
Sport in Nagpur
2008 in Indian cricket
2009 in Indian cricket